Phloeocharinae Erichson 1839 are a subfamily of Staphylinidae.

Anatomy
Procoxae without mesal grove.
Abdominal tergites IV and V each with a pair of distinctive cuticular combs.
Hypopharynx distinctive.
Tarsi 5-5-5

Ecology
Habitat: generally found in damp places, leaf litter, under bark.
Collection Method: sift/Berlese forest litter, barking, luck.
Biology: poorly known.

Systematics
Five genera and six species in North America. In Europe only the genus Phloeocharis, with 12 species mostly in the Mediterranean, only P. subtilissima widespread throughout Europe.

References
Newton, A. F., Jr., M. K. Thayer, J. S. Ashe, and D. S. Chandler. 2001. 22. Staphylinidae Latreille, 1802. p. 272–418. In: R. H. Arnett, Jr., and M. C. Thomas (eds.). American beetles, Volume 1. CRC Press; Boca Raton, Florida. ix + 443 p.

References

External links

Phloeocharinae at Bugguide.net. 

Staphylinidae
Beetle subfamilies